Unión Deportiva Granadilla Tenerife, commonly shortened as UDG Tenerife, is a Spanish women's football club based in Granadilla de Abona, in the Canary Islands. The club plays in Liga F, holding home games at Estadio Francisco Suárez, with a 2,000-seat capacity.

History

The club was founded in 2013 as UD Granadilla Tenerife Sur and started playing its first season in the second division. It won its group but was finally eliminated in the promotion playoffs by Granada. In its second attempt, the club finished as runner-up of the Canarian group, but qualified for the promotion playoffs as the best second-placed team. Granadilla achieved the promotion to the top tier after eliminating Levante Las Planas and Real Betis.

In its debut in Primera División, Granadilla performed a great season by finishing in the seventh position of the league table and, subsequently, qualifying for the Copa de la Reina, where it was eliminated in the quarterfinals by Valencia.

In November 2016, the club created a basketball section that made its debut in the 2016–17 Canarian regional league with the name of UD Hotel Médano, for sponsorship reasons. The football team repeated qualification to the Copa de la Reina and reached the semifinals.

In the 2017–18 season, UDG Tenerife made their best performance ever and finished the league in the fourth position and repeated presence in the semifinals of the Cup competition.

Season by season

Players

Current squad

Reserve team

References

External links
Official website 
"La UD Granadilla Tenerife-Sur: de la nada a la élite nacional en tan solo seis años"; Miguel Ángel García Rodríguez. September 2019 (in Spanish)

Association football clubs established in 2011
2011 establishments in Spain
Women's football clubs in Spain
Football clubs in the Canary Islands
Sport in Tenerife
Primera División (women) clubs